The Wittman W-8 Tailwind is a popular two-seat light aircraft for homebuilding. It is a high-wing, braced cabin monoplane of taildragger configuration. It is constructed with a steel tubing fuselage, wood wings, and fabric covering. It offers exceptional cruising speeds and is economical to operate and maintain.

Design and development  
The Tailwind is the third in a series of high-wing aircraft designed by Sylvester J. "Steve" Wittman (1904–1995), a well-known air racing pilot and race plane designer, who also played an important role in the emergence of homebuilt aircraft with the Wittman Tailwind and other designs in the United States. The first, the Wittman Buttercup two-seater, and later the Wittman Big X four-seater, which was bought by Cessna to use its spring steel landing gear. The Tailwind also inspired the last iteration, the O and O Special. A model of the 1965 Wittman Tailwind may be found in the Sun 'n Fun Museum.

Wittman developed the C-85 powered "Flying Carpet" in 1953, later renaming it to the "Tailwind". In 1953, the Tailwind became the first aircraft covered under the FAA's Experimental category to be certified to carry a passenger. While crude looking by modern standards, it outperformed many similar factory-built planes, and only with the advent of composite construction were new designs able to achieve similar speed per horsepower and range.

Steve Wittman and his wife were killed April 27, 1995 when their "O&O Special", a similar, larger and one-of-a-kind aircraft crashed. The propeller and some fabric covering from this "O&O Special" is on display in the Wittman hangar located on the Pioneer Airport, Oshkosh, Wisconsin.

Aircraft Spruce & Specialty Co of Corona, California acquired the rights to the Tailwind in January 1996 and became the exclusive distributor for plans and materials.

Variants  
 
W-8 Tailwind
The W-8 (initial version) updated to a new designation, the W-10.
Overton Tailwind — One example built with a 25 ft constant taper wing with wood spar, foam and composite skin construction.
W-9 Tailwind
The W-9L was introduced in 1958 with a constant-speed propeller, 35 gallon fuel tank, and a tricycle landing gear. 

W-10 Tailwind
Tapered wingtips, Tricycle gear version options
AJEP Tailwind
Marketed in the UK by AJEP in the 1970s in both kit and ready-to-fly form.

Specifications (1953 W.8)

See also

References  

 
 Airventure Museum Web site

External links  

Wittman Tailwind Page at Aircraft Spruce

1950s United States sport aircraft
Homebuilt aircraft
Tailwind
High-wing aircraft
Single-engined tractor aircraft